I'm Asian American and... is an American reality television series on Asian American cable network Myx TV. It features different stories about Asian Americans who break stereotypes associated with their community. The show is Myx TV's first original reality series. It premiered on April 23, 2014 and concluded on June 25, 2014.

Episodes

Awards and nominations
Third Place, Digital Marketing Tactics, 2014 NAMIC EMMA Awards.
Nominee, Best Show or Series Other, 2014 CableFAX Program Awards.
Nominee, Diversity Campaign or Initiative, 2014 Cynopsis Social Good Awards.

References

2014 American television series debuts
2014 American television series endings
2010s American reality television series
2010s American documentary television series
Asian-American television
Asian-American issues